Kranuan is a district (amphoe) of Khon Kaen province, northeastern Thailand.

History
The minor district (king amphoe) Kranuan was established on 1 January 1948 by splitting it from Nam Phong district. It was upgraded to a full district on 22 July 1958.

Geography
Neighboring districts are (from the south clockwise): Sam Sung and Nam Phong of Khon Kaen Province; Non Sa-at and Kumphawapi of Udon Thani province; Tha Khantho, Nong Kung Si, and Huai Mek of Kalasin province; and Chuen Chom of Maha Sarakham province.

Administration
The district is divided into nine subdistricts (tambons), which are further subdivided into 81 villages (mubans). Nong Ko is a township (thesaban tambon) which covers parts of tambon Nong Ko. There are a further nine tambon administrative organizations (TAO).

External links
https://www.webcitation.org/5knAmAxUH?url=http://www.geocities.com/amphurkranuan (Archived (Archived 2009-10-25) (Thai)

Kranuan